The doubles luge at the 2006 Winter Olympics took place on February 15 at Cesana Pariol.

Results

Two runs were held on February 15 and the final placements were determined by the combined total of both runs.

References

Doubles
Men's events at the 2006 Winter Olympics